The 1995–96 Liga Indonesia Premier Division (known as the Liga Dunhill for sponsorship reasons) was the second season of the Liga Indonesia Premier Division, the top division of Indonesian football. The season began on 26 November 1995 and ended on 6 October 1996. Bandung Raya won the title after beating PSM 2–0 in the final.

Teams

Team changes
The number of teams dropped from 34 to 31 this season.

Relegated to First Division 

 PS Bengkulu
 Warna Agung
 PSIR
 PSIM

Promoted to Premier Division 

 Persikab
 Persma

Withdrew from Premier Division 

 Persiku

Name changes 

 Mataram Putra changed its name to Mataram Indocement

Stadiums and locations

Kits and sponsorship 
All of the teams kits are provided by Adidas and sponsored by Dunhill as part of the league's sponsorship deal.

First stage

West Division

East Division

Second stage

Group A

Group B

Group C

Ranking of second-placed teams

</onlyinclude>

Knockout stage

Semifinals

Final

Awards

Top scorers
The following is a list of the top scorers from the 1995-96 season.

Best player

  Ronny Wabia (Persipura)

References

External links
Indonesia - List of final tables (RSSSF)

Indonesian Premier Division seasons
1995–96 in Indonesian football
Indonesia
Top level Indonesian football league seasons